The Sclerogastraceae are a family of fungi in the order Geastrales. The family contains the single genus Sclerogaster, which contains 10 species found in Europe and America. The genus was circumscribed by botanist Rudolf Hesse in 1891.

Species
Sclerogaster candidus
Sclerogaster columellatus
Sclerogaster compactus
Sclerogaster gastrosporioides
Sclerogaster hysterangioides
Sclerogaster luteocarneus
Sclerogaster minor
Sclerogaster pacificus
Sclerogaster siculus
Sclerogaster xerophilus

References

External links

Agaricomycetes
Agaricomycetes genera